is a railway station in the city of Okazaki, Aichi, Japan, operated by Meitetsu.

Lines
Meiden Yamanaka Station is served by the Meitetsu Nagoya Main Line and is 20.4 kilometers from the terminus of the line at Toyohashi Station.

Station layout
The station has two opposed side platforms. The station has automated ticket machines, Manaca automated turnstiles and is unattended.

Platforms

Adjacent stations

Station history
The Aichi Electric Railway was acquired by the Meitetsu Group on 1 August 1935. The station received its present name on 1 December 1938. The station platforms and tracks were elevated on 24 October 1992.

Passenger statistics
In fiscal 2017, the station was used by an average of 452 passengers daily.

Surrounding area
 Japan National Route 1
 Yamanaka Elementary School

See also
 List of Railway Stations in Japan

References

External links

 Official web page 

Railway stations in Japan opened in 1926
Railway stations in Aichi Prefecture
Stations of Nagoya Railroad
Okazaki, Aichi